Habibi Public Inter College is a senior secondary school in Moradabad, Uttar Pradesh, India. The school is affiliated with U P Madhyamik Shiksha Parishad. It is a government-aided institution.

Location

It is situated on Dingarpur-Kundarki road in the town Moradabad, distance 300 metres from Moradabad-Sambhal national high way.

History
This school was founded in 1998 and got recognition as an upper primary school. It was upgraded to a High School in 2009 and to 10+2 classes in 2014 with faculties for arts and science.

Transport

Faculties

Humanities 
Science
Commerce
Art

Facilities

This school has a playground,  reading room, canteen, cycle standa and laboratories for science students (Physics, Chemistry and Biology).

Management

President: Mashkur Jawed
Manager :  Mehmood Jawed
Secretary: Meraj Khan

List of Head Masters

References

High schools and secondary schools in Uttar Pradesh
Intermediate colleges in Uttar Pradesh
Education in Moradabad
Educational institutions established in 1998
1998 establishments in Uttar Pradesh